ACD may refer to:

Brands and enterprises
 ACD (telecommunications company), carrier and Internet Service Provider, headquartered in Lansing, Michigan
 ACD Systems, a computer software manufacturer
 Advanced Chemistry Development (ACD/Labs), a chemistry software company

Organizations
 ACD San Marcial, a Spanish football team based in Lardero, La Rioja
 Adelaide College of Divinity, an Australian theological college
 Arbeitsgemeinschaft der Christengemeinden in Deutschland (Association of Christian Churches in Germany)
 Asia Cooperation Dialogue, an international organization
 Centre Right Alliance (Romania), a political alliance
 Australasian College of Dermatologists, a medical specialist college

People
 Arthur Conan Doyle, creator of Sherlock Holmes

Science and healthcare
 ACD (gene), protein encoded by the ACD gene
 α-Cyclodextrin, a glucose polymer
 Alveolar capillary dysplasia, disorder of the lung
Anemia of chronic disease, form of anemia
 Aragonite compensation depth, a property of oceans
 Allergic contact dermatitis, form of contact dermatitis

Technology
 Activity-centered design, design based on how humans interact with technology
 Anti-collision device, on Indian railways
 Apple Cinema Display, a line of monitors
 Automatic call distributor, device that directs incoming phone calls
 Average call duration, average length of telephone calls

Other uses
 ACD (album), a 1989 album by Half Man Half Biscuit
 Adjournment in contemplation of dismissal, court ruling to defer the disposition of a defendant's case
 Antecedent-contained deletion in grammar
 Activity cycle diagram, a systems modelling paradigm
 Autoregressive conditional duration, a class of models used in financial econometrics
 Kyode language (ISO 639-3 code), a Guang language of Ghana
 Australian Cattle Dog, a breed of herding dog
 Alcides Fernández Airport, an airport in Acandí, Colombia